King's Quay is a place on the north east coast of the Isle of Wight, an island off the South Coast of England. It is said, probably apocryphally, to have been the place that King John fled to after signing Magna Carta, from which it derives its name.

It is private land, part of the  Barton Estate, and is a Site of Special Scientific Interest and Ramsar site. It is rich in fossils, particularly of oligocene fish and mesolithic artifacts in a rocky outcrop known as the Osborne Beds.
It comprises an area of saltmarsh, sand and marsh, bounded by ancient woodlands at Wallhill Copse, Curlew Copse, Woodhouse Copse and Brickhill Copse.

The Quay is a causeway which is breached in one place leading to a stone bridge. 
During the Middle Ages, King's Quay and the adjoining Meads Hole to the north in Osborne Bay was the site of a market of stolen goods, the plunder of Isle of Wight pirates upon French and Spanish shipping.
It is inaccessible to the public, but can be approached from the south western end by Forestry Commission land at Woodhouse Copse.

See also
List of places on the Isle of Wight

References
Geological Conservation Review
Isle of Wight Biodiversity Action Plan
Natural England citation sheet
GENUKI information on the IOW
- An unusual anchorage

Sites of Special Scientific Interest on the Isle of Wight
Geography of the Isle of Wight